Hot metal may refer to:

Hot Metal, a British television comedy series set in a newspaper office
Hot metal typesetting
Pig iron in a liquid state
HoTMetaL, a pioneering HTML editor for web pages
A Heavy metal magazine that enjoyed wide circulation in Australia and New Zealand in the late 80s and 90s. Now defunct.